was a Japanese samurai warrior of the Sengoku period.  He is known as one of the "Twenty-Four Generals of Takeda Shingen". He was the father of Sanada Nobutsuna and Sanada Masayuki and grandfather of the legendary samurai warrior Sanada Yukimura of whom served Toyotomi clan.

Yukitaka was one of three "Danjo" generals to be named Danjōchū (Danjō stands for a formal title, Danjōchū; 弾正忠) by Shingen, along with Kōsaka Masanobu and Hoshina Masatoshi. Sanada clan lost his territory after being defeated by Murakami Yoshikiyo in the Battle of Unno Daira in 1541. A few years later, he became a vassal of Shingen Takeda.

Under Takeda Shingen, Sanada Yukitaka participated in the Battle of Odaihara in 1546  and the sieges of Toishi in 1550 and 1551, After the Battle of Toishi, Yukitaka and Sanada clan restored their old territory.

Throughout his life, Yukitaka contributed to the expansion of the domain of the Takeda clan.

References

Further reading
 Turnbull, Stephen (1998). The Samurai Sourcebook. London: Cassell & Co.

External links 
  "Legendary Takeda's 24 Generals" at Yamanashi-kankou.jp

1574 deaths
Samurai
Sanada clan
Takeda retainers
Year of birth uncertain
1512 births